10th Anniversary Album may refer to:

 10th Anniversary Album (The Ventures album), 1970
 10th Anniversary Album (Nat King Cole album), 1955